Secret Invasion is a 2008  comic book crossover storyline by Marvel Comics.

Secret Invasion may also refer to:

 Secret Invasion (TV series), an upcoming 2023 Disney+ miniseries
 The Secret Invasion, a 1964 film by Roger Corman

See also